Ginebis crumpii, common name Crump's margarite, is a species of sea snail, a marine gastropod mollusk in the family Eucyclidae.

Description
The size of the shell varies between 20 mm and 45 mm.

Distribution
This marine species occurs off Taiwan, Southern Japan, and in the  East China Sea

References

 Poppe G.T., Tagaro S.P. & Dekker H. (2006) The Seguenziidae, Chilodontidae, Trochidae, Calliostomatidae and Solariellidae of the Philippine Islands. Visaya Supplement 2: 1-228.
 Liu, J.Y. [Ruiyu] (ed.). (2008). Checklist of marine biota of China seas. China Science Press. 1267 pp

External links
 To Barcode of Life (1 barcode)
 To Encyclopedia of Life
 To GenBank (3 nucleotides; 1 proteins)
 To World Register of Marine Species
 

crumpii
Gastropods described in 1893